Kičevo Municipality is a municipality in the western part of North Macedonia. The municipal seat is the city of Kičevo. Kičevo Municipality is located in the Southwestern Statistical Region.

Geography
The municipality borders Mavrovo and Rostuša Municipality to the northwest, Debar Municipality to the west, Gostivar Municipality to the north, Makedonski Brod and Plasnica municipalities to the east, Demir Hisar Municipality to the south, and Debarca Municipality to the southwest.

Demographics

Prior to 2013 adjustment
According to the last national census from 2002 the municipality, prior to territorial adjustments in 2013, had 30,138 inhabitants. Ethnic groups in the municipality included:
Macedonians = 16,140 (53.6%)
Albanians = 9,202 (30.5%)
Turks = 2,430 (8.1%)
Roma = 1,630 (5.4%)
others.

Post-2013
Following the territorial adjustments in March 2013, the municipalities of Drugovo, Vraneštica, Zajas and Oslomej have been combined with Kičevo Municipality. Ethnic groups in the larger Kičevo Municipality, according to the 2002 and 2021 censuses include:

Mother tongues among the residents of Kičevo Municipality include:
Macedonian: 18,520 (46.7%)
Albanian: 16,351 (41.2%)
Persons for whom data are taken from administrative sources: 2,405 (6.1%)
Turkish: 1,905 (4.8%)
Romani: 375 (1.0%)
Others: 113 (0.3%)

History
On 26 November 2019, an earthquake struck Albania and Kičevo Municipality sent €12,000 for relief efforts.

References

External links

 Official website
 Portal Kicevo

 
Southwestern Statistical Region
Municipalities of North Macedonia